Broštica is a village in the municipality of Centar Župa, North Macedonia.

Demographics
Broštica has traditionally been inhabited by an Orthodox Macedonian and Muslim Macedonian speaking (Torbeš) population. A few Albanians live in the village alongside the Macedonian Muslim population of Broštica.

According to the 2002 census, the village had a total of 748 inhabitants. Ethnic groups in the village include:

Macedonians 622
Turks 124

References

External links

Villages in Centar Župa Municipality
Macedonian Muslim villages